Tabatha Saville is an Australian cricketer who plays for the South Australian Scorpions and the Adelaide Strikers.

Born in Suva, Fiji, Saville moved to Alice Springs, Northern Territory, Australia, at a young age.  She developed her cricketing talents in the Northern Territory, and was often the only girl playing in the side.  In early 2016, she was selected in Cricket Australia's Talent Squad after impressing at the under-18 National Championships, in which she represented South Australia.

Saville's potential was also recognised by South Australian Scorpions and Strikers coach Andrea McCauley.  In the lead up to the WBBL02 season (2016–17), she was added to the Adelaide Strikers' squad, as its youngest member.  She made her debut for the Strikers on 2 January 2017 against the Sydney Sixers, and her first significant contribution to the match was the catch that dismissed star Sixers player Ellyse Perry.

In October 2017, Saville made her debut for the Scorpions in a WNCL match against the Western Fury. In November 2018, she was named in the Adelaide Strikers' squad for the 2018–19 Women's Big Bash League season.

While based in Adelaide, Saville is studying at university as well as playing cricket.

References

External links

1998 births
Adelaide Strikers (WBBL) cricketers
Australian women cricketers
Cricketers from the Northern Territory
Living people
Sportswomen from the Northern Territory